Balatonkeresztúr is a village in Somogy county, Hungary.

The settlement is part of the Balatonboglár wine region.

Etymology
According to the local tradition, the village's name comes from the crossing of roads. However, the more well-accepted theory states that, like many other villages in Somogy County, Balatonkeresztúr was named after the patron of its church, in this case, Szent Kereszt.

History
According to László Szita, the settlement was completely Hungarian in the 18th century.

Culture
The Hungarian folk song Szép a huszár, ha felül a lovára was collected in 1923 in Balatonkeresztúr by Lajos Bárdos.

External links 
 Street map (Hungarian)

References 

Populated places in Somogy County